Kristofer Berglund (born August 12, 1988) is a Swedish professional ice hockey player currently an unrestricted free agent. He most recently played for Brynäs IF in the Swedish Hockey League (SHL). He was drafted by the St. Louis Blues in the fifth round of the 2008 NHL Entry Draft, 125th overall.

Playing career
Berglund joined Dinamo Riga of the Kontinental Hockey League (KHL) on a two-year contract on May 29, 2019, after two seasons with HV71. Following just one season with the Latvian based club, Berglund sought a release and returned to Sweden in securing a two-year deal with Brynäs IF of the SHL on 23 March 2020.

Awards and honors

References

External links
 

1988 births
Living people
Brynäs IF players
Dinamo Riga players
Färjestad BK players
HV71 players
Luleå HF players
St. Louis Blues draft picks
Swedish ice hockey defencemen
Växjö Lakers players
Sportspeople from Umeå